Rehaliya is situated in Sheo tehsil and located in Barmer district of Rajasthan, India. It is one of 299 villages in Sheo Block along with villages like Pannela and Makhan Ka Par. Nearby railway station of Rehaliya is Barmer.

References

External links
The Rehaliya

Villages in Barmer district